Márcio Appel Cheuiche (born 1 January 1979) is a Brazilian Olympic eventing rider. He competed at the 2016 Summer Olympics in Rio de Janeiro, where he finished 39th in the individual and 7th in the team competition. He also competed at the 2020 Summer Olympics, held July–August 2021 in Tokyo.

References

External links

Living people
1979 births
Brazilian male equestrians
Equestrians at the 2016 Summer Olympics
Olympic equestrians of Brazil
Equestrians at the 2020 Summer Olympics